Batuhan Altıntaş may refer to:

Batuhan Altıntaş (footballer) (born 1996), Turkish football player
Batuhan Altıntaş (sprinter) (born 1996), Turkish track and field sprinter